Paraclinus beebei, the Pink blenny, is a species of labrisomid blenny endemic to the Gulf of California. The specific name honors the American zoologist William Beebe (1877-1962) of the New York Zoological Society.

References

beebei
Fish described in 1952
Taxa named by Clark Hubbs